is a Japanese manga series by Kaori Tsurutani. BL Metamorphosis was serialized digitally in the monthly manga magazine Comic Newtype from November 17, 2017 to October 9, 2020. A live-action film adaptation premiered on June 17, 2022.

Since its release, BL Metamorphosis won the New Face Award at the 22nd Japan Media Arts Festival Awards and was nominated for the Manga Taishō in 2019 and 2021.

Plot

Yuki Ichinoi, a 75-year-old woman lonely after the death of her husband, comes across a BL (boys' love) manga in the bookstore one day and buys it out of curiosity. As Ichinoi returns to buy more BL manga, the two develop an odd friendship despite their 58-year-old age gap.

Characters

Media

Manga

BL Metamorphosis is written and illustrated by Kaori Tsurutani. It was serialized digitally on Comic Newtype from November 17, 2017 to October 9, 2020. The chapters were later released in five bound volumes by Kadokawa Shoten.

At Anime Expo 2019, Seven Seas Entertainment announced that they had licensed the series in English for North American distribution.

Film

A live-action film adaptation was announced in January 2021. The film is directed by Shunsuke Kariyama, with scripts by Yoshikazu Okada, and produced by Hidehiro Kawano, Yutaka Tanito, Hiroko Ōgura. It premiered on June 17, 2022.

Reception

BL Metamorphosis appeared on the top 50 best manga in the magazine Da Vinci. It was the #1 top-ranked manga in the women's category by Kono Manga ga Sugoi! and was named the #1 Best Manga of 2019 in Kono Manga o Yome!

Publishers Weekly described the series as having an "unhurried pace" and praised the artwork, comparing it to Princess Jellyfish due to its female-centric view on subcultures in Japan. Rebecca Silverman from Anime News Network also praised the story, describing it as a "lovely story of friendship" built on common interests.

Awards

References

External links

2017 manga
Japanese webcomics
Kadokawa Shoten manga
Live-action films based on manga
Manga adapted into films
Seven Seas Entertainment titles
Slice of life anime and manga
Webcomics in print
Yaoi anime and manga
Japanese drama films